Zelinka (Czech/Slovak feminine: Zelinková) is a Czech and Slovak surname. In both languages, zelený means 'green'. Notable people with the surname include:

Andreas Zelinka (1802–1868), Czech-Austrian politician, a Mayor of Vienna
Jessica Zelinka (born 1981), Canadian athlete
Miroslav Zelinka (born 1981), Czech football referee
Peter Zelinka (born 1957), Slovak biathlete

See also
 

Czech-language surnames
Slovak-language surnames